The year 2011 is the 17th year in the history of Fighting Network Rings, a mixed martial arts promotion based in Japan. In 2011 Fighting Network Rings held 5 events beginning with, Rings: The Outsider 15.

Events list

Rings: The Outsider 15

Rings: The Outsider 15 was an event held on February 13, 2011 at The Differ Ariake Arena in Tokyo, Japan.

Results

Rings: The Outsider 16

Rings: The Outsider 16 was an event held on May 8, 2011 at The Yokohama Cultural Gymnasium in Yokohama, Kanagawa, Japan.

Results

Rings: The Outsider 17

Rings: The Outsider 17 was an event held on July 17, 2011 at The Differ Ariake Arena in Tokyo, Japan.

Results

Rings: The Outsider 18

Rings: The Outsider 18 was an event held on August 14, 2011 at The Differ Ariake Arena in Tokyo, Japan.

Results

Rings: The Outsider 19

Rings: The Outsider 19 was an event held on November 13, 2011 at The Yokohama Cultural Gymnasium in Yokohama, Kanagawa, Japan.

Results

See also 
 Fighting Network Rings
 List of Fighting Network Rings events

References

Fighting Network Rings events
2011 in mixed martial arts